Brigadier Helen Guild Meechie CBE (19 January 1938 - 24 August 2000) became the highest ranking woman in the British Army, and Director of the Women's Royal Army Corps (WRAC)

Early life 

Meechie was born in Dundee, and attended the Morgan Academy, and the University of St Andrews, earning an MA in modern languages.  Subsequently, she gained a teaching diploma from Dundee College of Education, after which she decided to join the Army's graduate entry scheme, and was commissioned into the Women's Royal Army Corps (WRAC) in 1960, at age 22.

Career 
Meechie moved through the ranks, obtaining notable milestones. She was the first woman to graduate from Royal Military Academy Sandhurst, the first woman to attend both the National Defence College, and Royal College of Defence Studies, promoted to the rank of lieutenant-colonel.

She was posted in Britain, Cyprus and Hong Kong from 1961 to 1976.   She served three years in personnel at the Ministry of Defence, before being appointed  Commander WRAC Army of the Rhine, near the Berlin Wall.

In 1982 she was appointed Director of the WRAC, the top job for a woman in the British Army, and made an Honorary Aide to the Queen.  In 1986 she retired from the WRAC, and was awarded a CBE.  She also received an honorary doctorate from Dundee University, and was made an honorary colonel of Tayforth UOTC, which trains officer cadets from several universities in the east of Scotland. Subsequently, she returned to the Royal College of Defence Studies as Deputy Director-General of Personnel Services, retiring from the Army in 1991.

After retirement, she was involved in the WRAC Association, serving as vice-president and chair.  She was made a Freeman of the City of London, and an enthusiastic golfer, set up the WRAC Golf Society.

References 

1938 births
2000 deaths
Women's Royal Army Corps officers
Alumni of the University of St Andrews
Graduates of the Royal Military Academy Sandhurst
Military personnel from Dundee
British Army brigadiers
Graduates of the Royal College of Defence Studies